The MV Crosline was a wooden, diesel ship launched in Seattle on June 22, 1925 for the Crosby Direct Line Ferry Company. It could carry 300 passengers and 65 cars.

Career
Crosline was originally built for the Alki-Manchester Ferry route on Puget Sound in Washington state.

On May 20, 1942, the Crosline arrived in Vancouver to join the Burrard Inlet ferries. It was purchased because of the need for more ferries to take shipyard workers to the north shore. In 1947, after the war, the Crosline was sold to the ferry system of the Washington State Department of Highways where it was rebuilt into a double-ended ferry with a pilothouse and propulsion on both ends of the ferry. In 1951, Washington State Ferries was formed when the state acquired almost all of the Black Ball Line's assets, and the Crosline joined WSF's fleet.

The Croslines last trip was the 9:55 p.m. departure on Labor Day of 1967. The ferry system sold the ship later in the year on December 19. It was first used as a warehouse on Lake Union, than sold again in 1975, where it was moved to Coos Bay, Oregon to be used as a restaurant. The restaurant failed, and instead her superstructure was removed to become a warehouse again, but this time shore-based. Croslines hull was eventually disassembled, and the remaining timbers and planks became part of a fishing boat and a dock.

Notes

References
History of Metropolitan Vancouver
 Evergreenfleet.com (page on Crosline, with history and images (accessed 06-12-11)
 Demoro, Harre, The Evergreen Fleet – A Pictorial History of Washington State Ferries, Golden West Books, San Marino CA (1971) 
 Kline, Mary S., and Bayless, G.A., Ferryboats -- A Legend on Puget Sound, Bayless Books, Seattle, WA 1983 
 Newell, Gordon R. ed., H.W. McCurdy Marine History of the Pacific Northwest,  Superior Publishing, Seattle WA 1966 

Washington State Ferries vessels
Coos Bay, Oregon
Puget Sound Navigation Company
1925 ships
Ships built in Seattle